Larkana Tehsil is an administrative subdivision (tehsil) of Larkana District in the Sindh province of Pakistan. The city of Larkana is the capital.

History
During British rule, Larkana became the headquarters of Larkana District and Larkana Taluka - and for a time was part of the Bombay Presidency of British India.

The Imperial Gazetteer of India, written over a century ago during British rule, describes the taluka as follows:

Administration
The Assistant Commissioner of Taluka Larkana is Mr. Ahmed Ali Soomro.
Larkana Taluka is administratively subdivided into 18 Union Councils.

See also 
 History of Larkana

References

Talukas of Sindh
Larkana District